The Face is a British music, fashion, and culture monthly magazine originally published from 1980 to 2004, and relaunched in 2019.

It was first launched in May 1980 in London by Nick Logan, the British journalist who had previously been editor of New Musical Express and Smash Hits. Having narrowly survived a near closure in the early 1990s following the award of libel damages against the magazine, it finally ceased publication in 2004 as a result of dwindling circulation. Frequently referred to as having "changed culture" and credited with launching Kate Moss's career as a supermodel, the magazine was the subject of a number of museum exhibitions after its demise.

In April 2019 The Face was relaunched online at theface.com by current owner Wasted Talent, which also publishes the magazines Kerrang! and Mixmag and acquired rights to the title in 2017 from Bauer Media Group. The first physical issue of the new era was published on 13 September 2019.

Proposal 

Logan left the NME after five years as editor in 1978 and launched Smash Hits for Emap, the magazine division of printing company East Midlands Allied Press.

In the autumn of 1979, with Smash Hits circulation at 166,000 copies Logan proposed a new magazine – "a well-produced, well-designed and well-written monthly with music at its core but with expanding coverage of the subjects that informed it, from fashion and film to nightclubbing and social issues".

When Emap's directors passed on the proposal, Logan and his wife decided to go it alone and invest £3,500 savings into the new title, which he named The Face.

1980s 

Initially working out of the Smash Hits offices in Carnaby Street, central London, and using the off-the-shelf corporate entity Wagadon, which he had formed for his business relationship with Emap, Logan published the first issue of The Face on 1 May 1980.

Featuring a logo designed by Steve Bush, with whom Logan had worked on Smash Hits, and a portrait by photographer Chalkie Davies of Jerry Dammers of The Specials on the front cover, this issue sold 56,000 copies. Sales levelled over the next six months, but a fillip was provided by alliance with London's burgeoning New Romantic scene via articles written by young journalist Robert Elms with photographs by Derek Ridgers, Virginia Turbett and others.

The publication of lookalike rivals such as New Sounds, New Styles and Blitz and the launch of i-D magazine confirmed Logan had established a new publishing sector.

He moved into the first of a series of offices of his own in central London. Subsequently, Logan recruited young designer Neville Brody as art director in 1982, placing the magazine ahead of the pack visually. Brody drew on such early 20th century art and design movements as Constructivism to create a stark new visual language which would define certain visual aspects of 1980s Britain.

The style pages of The Face meanwhile set the pace for the wider fashion world, particularly those produced by the Buffalo collective, led by stylist Ray Petri and including photographer Jamie Morgan.

In the 1980s Logan's innovations at The Face included the November 1983 "New Life in Europe" issue, a co-production with nine continental European magazines including France's Actuel, and the 100th edition of September 1988 which incorporated a tri-fold on the front which featured the covers of every magazine published thus far.

1990s 

In 1990, shortly before being awarded the inaugural Marcus Morris Award for magazine innovation, Logan was diagnosed with cancer of the jaw and forced to take a nine-month sabbatical. On recovery he became editorial director at Wagadon, with Sheryl Garratt as editor of The Face and Dylan Jones editing companion title Arena.

In this period art director Phil Bicker, who had succeeded Neville Brody and Robin Derrick, actively pursued working relationships with young experimental photographers, including Corinne Day, Stephane Sednaoui, Nigel Shafran, David Sims and Juergen Teller, as well as stylists such as Melanie Ward.

Bicker's decision to make the unknown 16-year-old Kate Moss "the face of The Face" gave the supermodel her first exposure, particularly on the front of the July 1990 issue entitled "The 3rd Summer of Love".

In May 1992, a High Court jury found in favour of a libel claim by Jason Donovan that The Face had implied he was gay when he was not, and awarded the pop performer £292,000 in damages and costs. The singer later reduced the amount to £95,000 to be paid over several months and a fund was set up for readers and supporters.

Under Sheryl Garratt's direction with assistance from her successor Richard Benson and other writers including Lindsay Baker, Ashley Heath, Gavin Hills and Amy Raphael, The Face reflected the developments in club culture, fashion and what became known as Britart as well as musical genres including grunge, jungle and Britpop.

By this time the magazine's art direction and design team of Stuart Spalding and Lee Swillingham were showcasing such emerging photographic talents as Inez and Vinoodh and Norbert Schoerner.

The biggest selling issue of The Face was published in October 1995. With Robbie Williams on the cover, it sold 128,000 copies.

After Logan launched new titles Frank and Deluxe, Richard Benson became editorial director of Wagadon in 1998. His successor as editor of The Face was Adam Higginbotham who in turn was succeeded by Johnny Davis in spring 1999.

Sale to Emap and closure

In July 1999 amid plummeting circulation figures and aggressive competition from such titles as Loaded and Dazed & Confused, Logan sold Wagadon to Emap, which absorbed The Face, Arena and Arena Homme + into its lifestyle division

While Benson did not join Emap, Johnny Davis and Ashley Heath were among the team who made the transfer. In 2002 Davis was succeeded as editor by Neil Stevenson, co-founder of the Popbitch gossip website. By the spring of 2004 monthly sales had slipped to 40,000 copies and Emap consumer division head Paul Keenan announced the magazine's closure. It was reported at the time that Jason Donovan had formed a consortium to look at buying the title from Emap in an effort to save it, but the plan came to nothing. The final issue was published in May 2004. Rights to the title passed to Bauer Media Group when it acquired Emap in 2008.

Acquisition by Wasted Talent Media and relaunch 

Rights to the title The Face were acquired from Bauer Media Group in 2017 by UK publisher Wasted Talent Media, publishers of Kerrang! and Mixmag, which announced plans to relaunch the magazine. In April 2019 The Face was by current owner Wasted Talent, which also and acquired rights to the title in 2017 .

In March 2019, Wasted Talent's Jerry Perkins, who was a publisher at Bauer and its predecessor Emap, announced that the title would be relaunched online at theface.com in April 2019 and return as a print quarterly in late summer 2019. The first physical issue of the relaunched magazine was published on 13 September 2019 with a choice of four covers featuring contemporary celebrities Harry Styles, Dua Lipa, Rosalía and Tyler, the Creator.

Legacy 
In 2011, The Face was added to the permanent collection of the Design Museum, London,.

The Face was featured in the following exhibitions at London's Victoria and Albert Museum:
 Postmodernism: Style & Subversion 1970-1990 (2011).
 British Design From 1948: Innovation in the Modern Age at the Victoria & Albert Museum (2012).
 Club To Catwalk: London Fashion in the 1980s (2013/14)

The Story of the Face 
The history of the magazine during Nick Logan's ownership 1980–1999 is told in Paul Gorman's book The Story of the Face: The Magazine That Changed Culture, published by Thames & Hudson in November 2017.

Editors

Nick Logan 1980–1990
Sheryl Garratt 1990–1995
Richard Benson 1995–1998
Adam Higginbotham 1998–1999
Johnny Davis 1999–2002
Neil Stevenson 2002–2004
Stuart Brumfitt 2019–2020
Matthew Whitehouse 2020–present

See also
 Ray Gun (magazine)
 Emigre (magazine)
 Print (magazine)

References

External links
 
 The Face (1980–2004) – Flickr group of covers and spreads
 Drowned in Sound – News – ...and the Next Mags Facing the Chop Are... 

1980 establishments in the United Kingdom
2004 disestablishments in the United Kingdom
Monthly magazines published in the United Kingdom
Music magazines published in the United Kingdom
Fashion magazines published in the United Kingdom
Magazines published in London
Magazines established in 1980
Magazines disestablished in 2004
Magazines established in 2019